Klubi I Futbollit Vllaznia Shkodër, commonly known as Vllaznia is an Albanian football club based in the city of Shkodër. It is the association football branch of the Vllaznia Sports Club, which was founded on 16 February 1919. It is also the oldest club in Albania which means it is the first club created in Albania. The club have competed in every edition of Kategoria Superiore since 1930, which is the top tier of football in Albania, besides in the 1956–57, 1961-62 and 2018-19 football seasons.

Vllaznia is one of the most successful football clubs in Albania, having won nine Kategoria Superiore titles, eight Albanian Cups and two Albanian Supercups. They have only been relegated from the Kategoria Superiore three times in 1956 due to a disqualification, in 1961, and for the last time in decades in 2018.

The club's ground has been the Loro Boriçi Stadium since it was built in 1952, which is named after former Vllaznia and Albania national team captain. In 2016, the stadium was rebuilt into modern all-seater at the cost of  €17 million, and it now has a capacity of 16,022, making it the second largest stadium in Albania and the current home of the national team.

History

Background history

Football was introduced to the city of Shkodër in 1908, when a Maltese priest, Father Gut Ruter, brought a football into the city, which is considered to be the first time football was played in the country. The first football club formed in Albania was Indipendenca Shkodër, which began operating in 1912 under the guidance of founder Palokë Nika, who was also the captain of the team. The first football game organised in city took place in October 1913 between Indipendenca Shkodër and the occupying Austro-Hungarian Imperial Navy. It was the first time a football team composed of Albanians had played foreigners, making it the first international game to ever take place involving an Albanian team, as well as being the first 90-minute football game to be played with two 45 minute halves in the country. Indipendenca Shkodër lost the game 2–1, with the captain Palokë Nika scoring the only goal for the home side.

Early history

Following the rise in popularity of football in the city, this prompted Palokë Nika along with other sportspeople in the city to form a club that would cater for many sports including football and on 16 February 1919 the Vllaznia Sports Society was formed. Vllaznia is a concept in Albanian culture often translated as "brotherhood;" it refers to loyalty to one's fis (clan, tribe). They played games against other Albanian teams, notably playing KF Tirana in their first ever game in October 1920. The club also played international games, the first of which was against the occupying Italian troops on 23 May, who beat Vllaznia 1–0. Later in the year for Albanian Independence Day on 28 November Vllaznia organised another football game against an Italian selection again, this time losing 5–1. The club's first game outside of Albania was played on 31 August 1922 in Montenegro against FK Lovćen Cetinje, a match which they lost 4–0. The club would continue to play domestic friendly games until the creation of the Albanian Football Association in 1930 and the start of the Kategoria e Parë in the same year.

Championships of World War II
During the peak of World War II, between the years 1939 and 1942, Albanian Football Association organized three championships, in 1939, 1940 and 1942.
According to all information gathered in years from Albanian and foreign historians, players and veterans who lived these events, clear evidence proves the existence of these championships at that time, as well as the existence of three trophies given from Albanian Football Association officials themselves. One must not forget that 1942 Albanian Superliga had a nationwide participation – the first and the only one so far involving teams from both countries as Albania and Kosovo. KS Vllaznia won one such championship whilst KF Tirana won the other two championships in 1939 & 1942. This would update the championship trophies won by these clubs to respectively 10 and 26 at the present time.

After years of silence, Albanian Football Association have appointed a dedicated commission with 5 members, which is involved in gathering enough evidence in this regard. And finally, after a significant amount of evidence has been produced, it has been given an official date, when Albanian Football Association intend to officially recognize these 3 championships in their next General Assembly, to be held in February 2013.

In 1958 the club was renamed "KS Vllaznia". In the European Cup for Champions 1978/79 they beat Austrian team Austria Wien (who went on to the semifinals) 2–0 at home but lost 3–4 on aggregate. In the Cup Winners Cup of 1987/88 they reached the Round of 16  after beating Sliema Wanderes from Malta in both games (aggregate 6–0). In the 2001/2002 UEFA Champions league qualifying they beat KR Reykjavik from Iceland 2–1 in Reykjavik and 1–0 in Tirana with two goals from Klodian Duro. In next round KF Vllaznia were eliminated by the Turkish club Galatasaray 2–0 in Istanbul and 1–4 in Tirana. German Uli Schulze, a UEFA Cup Winners' Cup winner with 1. FC Magdeburg in 1974, was appointed as new coach in summer 2006. He was later replaced by Mirel Josa who is currently at his third spell coaching the team.

2000s
In the 2000s. Vllaznia went through changes, in 2003 the President of Vllaznia, Myftar Cela was shot in Montenegro. The President was loved by every Vllaznia fan, because of his generosity and he loved the team. After Cela died, a group of businessmen gathered to help the team.

In 2006. Albanian businessman, Valter Fushaj, became Vllaznia President. Since then he has been criticized by the fans for corruption and not wanting the best for the team.

In the 2009–2010. Vllaznia went through some rough changes; having to change 3 coaches and also replacing players. Vllaznia went to the bottom of the table, and having been criticized by the fans, Vllaznia went through some bad times.

On 17 April 2010. Vllaznia won 3–2 against Skënderbeu Korçë but the result was changed to a 2–0 loss for Vllaznia. This was because the player Ansi Nika wasn't on the team roster but was picked for the team anyway. This led to protests by the fans, making accusations that the Vllaznia staff and the President Valter Fushaj specifically did it for bribing reasons.

GEA Sport Era
Roberto Nava, the president of GEA Sport SA. Bought 50% of shares of KF Vllaznia and in July, Nava negotiates with Napoli to loan Sebastián Sosa for one year in Shkodër. After successful negotiations with Napoli, Nava transfers Sebastián Rodríguez and Giorginho Aguirre.

Vllaznia have been relegated from the Albanian Superliga in a dramatic situation for an elite club with a hundred years of history in the top flight of Albanian football in the 17/18 season, a team that suffered their last demotion almost six decades ago in the early 1960s. However, during the 18/19 season the team managed to promote to the Superliga.

Stadium

The home ground of the club is called "Loro Borici". The name comes from one of the club's and Albania's greatest footballer to ever play, Loro played with some of the biggest teams at that time, with Roma and Lazio. The striker was known for his goalscoring abilities which he displayed in the Serie A after he left Vllaznia in the 1930s.

Loro Boriçi stadium is a multi-purpose stadium in Shkodër, Albania. It is currently used mostly for football matches and is the home ground of Vllaznia Shkodër. The stadium holds about 16,000 spectators and was reconstructed in 2001. It is named in honour of Loro Boriçi, famous player in the 1940s and 1950s. It is also the second largest stadium in Albania behind the Qemal Stafa Stadium in Tirana which seats 19,600.

In October 2014, Edi Rama, prime minister of Albania, promised the reconstruction of the stadium, which was last renovated in 2001. He said that the stadium will be with a renewed capacity of about 20,000 spectators.

On 3 May 2015, construction works officially started, bringing the stadium to a renewed capacity of 17,500 seats.

During the 2015–16 Albanian Superliga season, Loro Boriçi Stadium was under re-construction, therefore Vllaznia used Ismail Xhemali Stadium in Pukë at the beginning of the season and then switched to Reshit Rusi Stadium in Shkodër for much of the season.

Fans

Vllaznia is one of the most popular and recognised teams amongst Albanian football fans in Albania, Kosovo and North Macedonia. The Ultras group of Vllaznia are known as 'Vllaznit Ultras' and were the first official ultras fan base in Albania who were created in 2005. They have strong ties with other Albanian Ultra groups such as the Ultras Guerrils who support KF Partizani Tirana and Armata E Veriut of FK Kukësi. It is known that Vllaznit Ultras meet up with opposition fans to greet each other before and after a game. Vllaznit Ultras are not just present in the football scene, they also attend Vllaznia's basketball matches to show their full support and love for Vllaznia at any sporting level. Fans of Vllaznia have always attended matches in high quantities, but in recent years the number of fans attending games has decreased due to the poor management and loss of confidence in the team. They have ties with Ultras Beveren, the supporters of Belgian team Waasland-Beveren

Despite the low number of fans at Vllaznia's football games, they have recently turned up in strong numbers for the clubs basketball team, BC Vllaznia, due to their outstanding form in the past few years, having won the 3 Albanian Basketball League championships from 2014 to 2016.

Rivalries
Vllaznia's all time enemies are KF Tirana who are the most successful side in Albanian football. Both teams had been the only two in Albania to not have been relegated from the top tier of Albanian football, until on the final match day of 2017, where both sides fought out who would survive and go down in front of a full crowd (Vllaznia 0–0 Tirana), Tirana were relegated. This rivalry is known as the "All-time Albanian derby". The rivalry is mainly in existence because both sides were the first two football teams to be found in Albania, where Vllaznia was found in 1919, whilst KF Tirana was found in 1920. Another reason why this rivalry potentially exists is due to the historic popularity between these two sides. Vllaznia and Tirana were the only sides in Albania to have never been relegated in the Albanian Superliga, they both hold 78 official seasons and 81 unofficial seasons (including three unofficial championships during World War II) in Albanian top flight football going into the 2016-17 Albanian Superliga season.

Both ultra groups, the Vllaznit Ultras and Tirona Fanatics are known for their fierce rivalry in the stands and off the pitch, which was shown in a match played in Loro Boriçi Stadium in Shkodër on 11 September 2014. During this game there was a lot of tension which began in the second half of the game. The game was interrupted when Tirana's fans started throwing bottles and other objects to show their anger towards the referee's decisions. Late on, Tirana grabbed an equaliser through Ervin Bulku to level 1–1, and this sparked a huge brawl between the fans. Tirana fans ran onto the pitch and seemingly started throwing chairs and bottles at Vllaznia fans. From then on Vllaznia fans started attacking Tirana fans inside and outside of the stadium. Vllaznia's fans gave an official statement on Vllaznia's official Facebook page where they stated that what Tirana fans did was seen as an embarrassment and an insult to people of Shkodra and Albanian football, therefore action was needed. Amongst some of the injured people was Tirana's president, Refik Halili who was hit by a fan of Tirana with a stone. Vllaznia fans were given a 10 match ban from attending home games, whilst Tirana were given 15.

Vllaznia are also friendly rivals with Flamurtari Vlorë, but fans of both teams have good relations. Other derbies include the North Albanian derbies against Laçi and Kukësi. Laçi fans insist that the North Albanian derby is between Laçi and Vllaznia, whereas fans of Kukësi believe it is between Kukësi and Vllaznia. However history suggests that Besëlidhja Lezhë and Vllaznia were the most popular Northern Albanian sides decades ago.

Honours
Kategoria Superiore
Winners (9):1940*, 1945, 1946, 1971–72, 1973–74, 1977–78, 1982–83, 1991–92, 1997–98, 2000–01
Runners-up (11): 1932, 1933, 1936, 1937, 1947, 1949, 1974–75, 1996–97, 1998–99, 2002–03, 2008–09, 202–-21

Kategoria e Parë
Winners (2): 1957, 1962
Runners-up (1): 2018–19

Albanian Cup
Winners (8): 1964–65, 1971–72, 1978–79, 1980–81, 1986–87, 2007–08, 2020–21, 2021–22
Runners-up (8): 1938–39, 1965–66, 1967–68, 1969–70, 1985–86, 1998–99, 2005–06, 2009–10 

Albanian Supercup
Winners (2): 1998, 2001
Runners-up (4): 1992, 2008, 2021, 2022

KF Vllaznia Shkodër statistics in Kategoria Superiore

Since the Kategoria Superiore began in 1930, KF Vllaznia have played 1991 Superliga matches, scored 3181 goals and conceded 2053. The club has collected so far 2638 points, won 911 games, drawn 470 and lost 612. The club's goal difference is -106 and the winning difference is +1128.

Recent seasons

Records
Biggest ever home league victory: Vllaznia Shkodër 8–0 Flamurtari Vlorë – 6 February 1999
Biggest ever home league defeat: Vllaznia Shkodër 0–4 Dinamo Tirana – 25 September 2010
Biggest ever away league victory: KF Laçi 1–7 Vllaznia Shkodër – 18 December 2004 / KF Tirana 0–6 Vllaznia Shkodër - (1947) kf apolonia-KF VLLAZNIA 0-6 18.04.2021
Biggest ever away league defeat: KF Tirana 5–1 Vllaznia Shkodër – 28 February 2004
Biggest ever European home victory: Vllaznia Shkodër 3–0  Široki Brijeg – 15 July 2021
Biggest ever European home defeat: Vllaznia Shkodër 0–4  Trabzonspor – 14 July 2007
Biggest ever European away victory: Sliema Wanderers 0–4 Vllaznia Shkodër – 30 September 1987
Biggest ever European away defeat:  Trabzonspor 6–0 Vllaznia Shkodër – 8 July 2007

Albanian records from September 1997

KF Vllaznia in Europe
As of 28 July 2022.

 QR = Qualifying Round
 1R = 1st Round
 2R = 2nd Round

World & European Rankings

(As of 2 June 2022)

UEFA club coefficient ranking

Players

Current squad

Other players under contract

Current staff

Historical Coaches

 Palokë Nika (1920s)
 Ibrahim Dizdari (1945)
 Ernest Halepiani (1946)
 Skënder Jareci (1964-1965)
 Xhevdet Shaqiri (1966–1979)
 Medin Zhega (1980–1982)
 Ramazan Rragami (1982–1985)
 Astrit Hafizi (1985–1988)
 Ramazan Rragami (1988–1990)
 Astrit Hafizi (1990–1995)
 Sabah Bizi (1995)
 Hysen Dedja (1996–1998)
 Vasil Bici (1998–1999)
 Ramazan Rragami (1999–2000)
 Derviš Hadžiosmanović (2000–2001)
 Astrit Hafizi (2002)
 Hysen Dedja (2002)
 Ramadan Shehu (2003)
 Vasil Bici ( - 6 March 2005)
 Agim Medja (6 Mar 2005 - Jun 2005)
 Derviš Hadžiosmanović (Jul 2005 - 5 October 2005)
 Hysen Dedja (5 Oct 2005 - Jun 2006)
 Ulrich Schulze (Jul 2006 - 13 November 2006)
 Mirel Josa (13 Nov 2006 – 8 March 2008)
 Derviš Hadžiosmanović (8 Mar 2008 – Jun 2008)
 Agim Canaj (Jul 2008 – 2 March 2009)
 Derviš Hadžiosmanović (2 Mar 2009 – Jun 2009)
 Hasan Lika (Jul 2009 – 4 October 2009)
 Roland Luçi (4 Oct 2009 – 22 December 2009)
 Edi Martini (22 Dec 2009 – Jun 2010)
 Mojaš Radonjić (Jul 2010 – 26 October 2010)
 Mirel Josa (26 Oct 2010 – 25 October 2011)
 Elvis Plori  (Oct 2011)
 Rudi Vata (25 Oct 2011 – 10 April 2012)
 Armir Grimaj (10 Apr 2012 - Jun 2012)
 Shpëtim Duro (Jul 2012 - 20 December 2012)
 Artan Bushati (20 Dec 2012 - Jun 2013)
 Agim Canaj (Jul 2013 – 9 March 2014)
 Samuel Nikaj (Mar 2014)
 Derviš Hadžiosmanović (9 Mar 2014 - Jun 2014)
 Baldo Raineri (Jul 2014 - 3 March 2015)
 Luan Zmijani (3 Mar 2015 – 27 September 2015)
 Armir Grimaj (27 Sep 2015 – 9 January 2016)
 Armando Cungu (9 Jan 2016 - Oct 2017)
 Ernest Gjoka (Oct 2017 – May 2018)
 Ervis Kraja (May 2018 - Jun 2018)
 Hasan Lika (Aug 2018 - Mar 2019)
 Agim Canaj (Mar 2019 – Jul 2019)
 Mirsad Jonuz (Jul 2019 – Jun 2020)
 Hysen Dedja (Jun 2020 – Aug 2020)
 Thomas Brdarić (Sep 2020 – Mar 2022)
 Elvis Plori (Mar 2022 – May 2022)
 Mirel Josa (May 2022 – Mar 2023)
 Vioresin Sinani (Mar 2023 – )

Title winning Managers

Notable former youth players

Hamdi Salihi
Xhevahir Sukaj
Vioresin Sinani
Armando Vajushi
Bekim Balaj
Elseid Hysaj
Rudi Vata
Loro Boriçi
Admir Teli
Gilman Lika
Erjon Vucaj
Edon Hasani
Dodë Tahiri
Armando Cungu
Palokë Nika
Edi Martini
Luan Zmijani
Armir Grimaj
Ramazan Rragami
Elvin Beqiri
Paulin Ndoja
Amarildo Belisha
Suad Lici
Medin Zhega

Women's team
A women's team was created in 2013. When three time Albanian champion KF Ada Velipojë disestablished their women's team, the whole team moved to Vllaznia and formed a new women's section. The team then won the 2013–14 Albanian women's football championship and competed in the 2014–15 UEFA Women's Champions League. Vllaznia was the first Albanian team draw or win a match when they beat Faroes side KI 2–1. UEFA considers them as a successor team and credits Ada's results to them.

References

External links

Official website

 
Football clubs in Albania
Association football clubs established in 1919
1919 establishments in Albania
Sport in Shkodër
Football clubs in Shkodër